DNSS points, also known as Sethi-Skiba points, arise in optimal control problems that exhibit multiple optimal solutions. A DNSS pointnamed alphabetically after Deckert and Nishimura, Sethi, and Skibais an indifference point in an optimal control problem such that starting from such a point, the problem has more than one different optimal solutions. A good discussion of such points can be found in Grass et al.

Definition 
Of particular interest here are discounted infinite horizon optimal control problems that are autonomous. These problems can be formulated as

 

s.t.

 

Furthermore, it is assumed that the integral converges for any admissible solution . In such a problem with one-dimensional state variable , the initial state  is called a DNSS point if the system starting from it exhibits multiple optimal solutions or equilibria. In this sense,  is an indifference point from which the system could move to either of the two equilibria.

For two-dimensional optimal control problems, Grass et al. and Zeiler et al. present examples that exhibit DNSS curves. 

Some references on the application of DNSS points are Caulkins et al. and Zeiler et al.

History 
Suresh P. Sethi identified such indifference points for the first time in 1977. Further, Skiba, Sethi, and Deckert and Nishimura explored these indifference points in economic models. The term DNSS (Deckert, Nishimura, Sethi, Skiba) points, introduced by Grass et al., recognizes (alphabetically) the contributions of these authors.

These indifference points have been referred to earlier as Skiba points or DNS points in the literature.

Example 

Extensions 
For further details and extensions, the reader is referred to Grass et al.

References

Optimal control
Mathematical economics